, is a Japanese idol, singer, and actor from the Japanese idol group KAT-TUN. Born in Kanagawa in Japan, he joined the Japanese talent agency, Johnny & Associates in 1998. In March 2006 he debuted as a member of the Japanese boy band KAT-TUN and is under Johnny & Associates management. The group's name was an acronym based on the first letter of each member's family name until the departure of Jin Akanishi in 2010, and Koki Tanaka in 2013. Junnosuke Taguchi left the band a well in 2016. After Tanaka's and Taguchi's withdrawal, Ueda took the T's for TaTsuya. As of 2016, KAT-TUN stands for Kazuya KAmenashi, TaTsuya Ueda, and Yuichi Nakamaru. Ueda is very athletic, and his favorite hobbies include Boxing .

Group participation 
 B.B.A.
 M.A.D.
 B.B.D.
 KAT-TUN
 Toshi Otoko Unit
 MOUSE PEACE (Solo concert's band)

Career 
 Joined Johnny & Associates after the audition on June 22, 1998.
 In 2001, he was grouped up as KAT-TUN for an NHK program "Pop Jam" to backdance for Kinki Kid's Koichi Domoto. On March 22, 2006, he debuted as KAT-TUN by releasing "Real Face" single.  
 On September 8–21, 2008, he held his first solo concert tour called "MOUSE PEACE".  
 In 2009, he first starred as Romeo in a stageplay "Romeo and Juliet," at Tokyo Globe Theatre (March 4–29, 2009) and Sankei Hall Breeze (April 2–5, 2009). In addition, in April, he debuted in a Fuji TV drama series "Konkatsu!". 
 On August October 4–3, 2010, he held his solo concert, "MOUSE PEACE uniting with FiVe TATSUYA UEDA LIVE 2010".
 In October 2011, Ueda announced his second drama series, "Runaway~Aisuru Kimi no Tame ni" on TBS.  He was reported to shave his head during a scene in the drama.
 In May 2012, Ueda announced his third drama series, "Boys on the Run" on TV Asahi.
 In October 2013, it was announced that Ueda will be starring in a stage play next year titled "Tōmin suru kuma ni soine shite goran". It will be Ueda's stage comeback since "Romeo and Juliet".

Filmography

Television 
 2000 – Kowai Nichiyoubi (NTV, episode 8, episode 15)
 2001 – Shijou Saiyaku no Date
 2009 – Konkatsu! (Fuji TV) – Kuniyasu Amamiya
 2011 – Runaway ~Aisuru Kimi no Tame ni~ (TBS) – Kuya Takimoto
 2012 – Boys on the Run (TV Asahi) – Ryuu Andou
 2017 – Shikaku Tantei Higurashi Tabito (NTV) – Tsuruta Kamekichi
 2017 – Shinjuku Seven (TV Tokyo) – Nanase
 2021 – Nemesis (NTV) – Kensho Hoshi

Film
 2013 – The Eternal Zero
 2023 – Nemesis: The Movie – Kensho Hoshi

Stage plays 
 MILLENNIUM SHOCK (2000)
 SHOW geki SHOCK (2001, 2002)
 SHOCK is Real Shock (2003)
 Hey! Say! Dream Boy (2005)
 Dream Boys (2006)
 Romeo and Juliet (2009)
 Tōmin suru kuma ni soine shite goran (2014)
 Aoi Hitomi (2015)

Solo concerts 
 TATSUYA UEDA LIVE 2008 『MOUSE PEACE』 (September 8–21, 2008, at Johnnys Theatre)
 MOUSE PEACE uniting with FiVe TATSUYA UEDA LIVE 2010 (August 4 – October 3, 2010, 7 performances in 5 cities)

Discography

Solo songs and Duets

Awards

References 

Johnny & Associates
KAT-TUN members
Japanese male pop singers
Japanese idols
Japanese television personalities
Living people
1983 births
Musicians from Kanagawa Prefecture
21st-century Japanese singers
21st-century Japanese male singers